Nobil Huomo Giorgio Cornaro, called "Padre della Patria" (1452 – 31 July 1527) was a Venetian nobleman and politician.

Life 
Giorgio Cornaro was born in Venice in 1452. He was the son of Nobil Huomo Marco Cornaro (December 1406 – 1 August 1479) by his wife, married in 1444, Fiorenza Crispo (1422 – 1501), daughter of Nicholas Crispo, Lord of Syros. His sister was Catherine Cornaro, Queen of Cyprus.

He married in Venice in 1475 Nobil Donna Elisabetta Morosini, Patrizia Veneta, and had issue, called "Cornaro della Regina".

He died in Venice on 31 July 1527.

Offices 

 Knight of the Holy Roman Empire, 
 Patrician of the Republic of Venice, 
 Podestà of Brescia in 1496, 
 Procurator of St Mark's.

Likeness 
Giorgio is depicted in a double portrait, with his son Cardinal Francesco Cornaro, in the National Gallery of Ireland.

Footnotes

References
 Gable, C. I. (1997). "Cav. Proc. Giorgio Cornaro (B-29)". Boglewood. Retrieved 10 November 2022.
 Healy, Rachel (2016). "A Portrait of Two Venetian Gentlemen: A Question of Identity", Artefact
 Marek, Miroslav (16 December 2002). "Crispo family". Genealogy.EU. Retrieved 10 November 2022.
 "Giorgio Cornaro (1452-1527) and his Son Francesco Cornaro (1478-1543)". National Gallery of Ireland. Retrieved 10 November 2022.

1452 births
1527 deaths
Giorgio
Procurators of Saint Mark
15th-century Venetian people
16th-century Venetian people